The Rajdoot Excel T is a 173 cc two-stroke motorcycle that was made in India by Escorts Group.

The motorcycle division of Escorts Group started manufacturing the Polish SHL M11 175 cc motorcycle under the brand name Rajdoot from 1962. Various derivatives were produced with slight changes in cycle parts, suspension and transmission. Production continued for over four decades.

Rajdoot sold about 1.6 million black "soviet" styled motorbikes, in the Excel T and Deluxe models, until it was phased out in 2005 due to Euro II emission regulations.

References

Escorts motorcycles
Motorcycles introduced in 1962
Two-stroke motorcycles